The 1979 Northwest Territories general election was held on October 1, 1979.

Twenty-two members were elected to the Northwest Territories Legislative Assembly. In 1980, George Braden was named "Government Leader", the first democratic leader of the Northwest Territories since Frederick Haultain in 1905 and the first of its modern boundaries. In 1994, he was retroactively given the title Premier of the Northwest Territories.

Election summary

Members of the Legislative Assembly elected
For complete electoral history, see individual districts

References

Elections in the Northwest Territories
1979 elections in Canada
October 1979 events in Canada
1979 in the Northwest Territories